Will the Circle Be Unbroken, Volume III is the 2002 album from The Nitty Gritty Dirt Band. This album reached 18 on the US Country chart. Earlier albums in the series include Will the Circle Be Unbroken and Will the Circle Be Unbroken: Volume II.

Track listing
Disc 1
"Take Me in Your Lifeboat" (Traditional) – 3:42
"Milk Cow Blues" (Kokomo Arnold) – 5:03
"I Find Jesus" (Jimmy Ibbotson) – 3:52
"Hold Whatcha Got" (Jimmy Martin) – 2:55
"Mama's Opry" (Iris DeMent) – 4:21
"Diamonds in the Rough" (A. P. Carter, Maybelle Carter, Sara Carter) – 3:39
"Lonesome River" (Carter Stanley) – 4:23
"Some Dark Holler" (Traditional) – 3:19
"The Lowlands" (Gary Scruggs) – 3:49
"Love, Please Come Home" (Leon Jackson) – 2:48
"Goodnight Irene" (Huddie Ledbetter, John A. Lomax) – 3:54
"I Know What It Means to be Lonesome" (James Brockman, James Kendis, Nathaniel Vincent) – 3:49
"I'll Be Faithful to You" (Paul Kennerley) – 2:32
"Tears in the Holston River" (John R. Cash) – 4:14
Disc 2
"Fishin' Blues" (Traditional) – 4:31
"Save It, Save It" (Charles Rufus Shoffner) – 1:57
"Wheels" (Chris Hillman, Gram Parsons) – 3:14
"Roll in My Sweet Baby's Arms" (Traditional) – 3:53
"Oh Cumberland" (Matraca Berg, Gary Harrison) – 4:21
"I Am a Pilgrim" (Traditional) – 4:09
"Sallie Ann" (Earl Scruggs) – 2:37
"Catfish John" (Bob McDill, Alan Reynolds) – 4:07
"Roll the Stone Away" (Jeff Hanna, Marcus Hummon) – 4:09
"All Prayed Up" (Vince Gill) – 3:09
"Return to Dismal Swamp II" (Walter McEuen, William McEuen) – 3:16
"There is a Time" (Mitchell Jayne, Rodney Dillard) – 3:31
"Will the Circle Be Unbroken/Glory, Glory" (A. P. Carter, Traditional) – 4:39
"Farther Along" (Traditional) – 1:10

Enhanced CD Extras 
Disc 2 also contains a behind the scenes video of the song "Take Me in Your Lifeboat".

Personnel
Jeff Hanna – lead and harmony vocals, guitar, mandolin, National slide guitar, washboard
Jimmy Ibbotson – lead and harmony vocals, snare, percussion box, guitar, bouzouki, drum box, kick drum, porch board
Bob Carpenter – harmony vocals, accordion
Jimmie Fadden – harmonica, snare, harmony vocal
John McEuen – banjo, mandolin, frailing banjo, finger style lead guitar, harmony vocal

Featured Lead vocalists
Del McCoury – lead vocal, guitar
Doc Watson – lead vocal, guitar
Randy Scruggs – lead vocal, guitar, banjo, mandolin
Jimmy Martin – lead vocal, guitar
Iris DeMent – lead vocal, guitar
June Carter Cash – lead vocal, autoharp
Sam Bush – lead vocal, mandolin
Dwight Yoakam – lead vocal, guitar
Jaime Hanna – lead vocal, guitar, sticks
Jonathan McEuen – lead vocal, guitar
Willie Nelson – lead vocal, guitar
Matraca Berg – lead vocal, harmony vocal, guitar
Tom Petty – lead vocal, guitar
Pat Enright – lead vocal, guitar
Emmylou Harris – lead vocal, guitar, harmony vocal
Johnny Cash – lead vocal, guitar
Taj Mahal – lead vocal, archtop guitar
Alison Krauss – lead vocal, fiddle
Vince Gill – lead vocal, guitar
Rodney Dillard – lead vocals, guitar
Ricky Skaggs – lead vocals, mandolin

Special guest musicians
Robbie McCoury – banjo
Ronnie McCoury – mandolin
Glen Duncan – fiddle
Byron House – upright bass
Richard Watson – guitar
Josh Graves – dobro
Ray Martin – harmony vocal, mandolin
David Nance – harmony vocal, dobro
Kevin Grantt – upright bass
Earl Scruggs – banjo
Dan Dugmore – dobro
Glenn Worf – upright bass
Mickey Raphael – harmonica
David Jackson – upright bass
Alan O'Brant – banjo
Stuart Duncan – fiddle
Mike Compton – mandolin
Dennis Crouch – upright bass
Vassar Clements – fiddle
Jerry Douglas – dobro
Barry Bales – upright bass
Tony Rice – lead guitar

Chart performance

References
All information is from the album liner notes unless otherwise noted.

Nitty Gritty Dirt Band albums
2002 albums
Capitol Records albums
Collaborative albums